Elizabeth Searle is an American novelist, short story writer, playwright and screenwriter.  She is co-writer of "I'll Show You Mine," a feature film in post-production from Duplass Brothers Productions and forthcoming in 2022.

Her theater works have received major media attention and have been performed around the country. 

Her novel "A Four-Sided Bed" is currently being developed as a feature film. A short film based on the novel, 'Four-Sided,' screened at 2019 festivals in Cannes, Boston, Chicago and more. Searle is co-writer with David Shields and Tiffany Louquet of 'I'll Show You Mine,' a forthcoming feature film directed by Megan Griffiths. 

Elizabeth's most recent novel is 'We Got Him' (New Rivers Press) which was released in AudioBook in 2018.  She is the creator and playwright for 'Tonya & Nancy: the Rock Opera' (music by Michael Teoli) which most recently was produced in February 2020 in an award-winning TheatreZone production starring Broadway great Andrea McArdle (the original ANNIE).  

A Tonya & Nancy concert at 54Below, featuring Broadway performers, was recorded as a CD from Broadway Records and produced as a concert film, available in 2021. The show has had full productions in NYC (at NYMF), in Chicago, LA, Portland Oregon, suburban Dallas and Boston at the ART's Club Oberon Theater. Searle's novel 'Girl Held in Home' was selected for New Rivers Press American Fiction Series. 'A Four Sided Bed' was nominated for an ALA award and various Editor's Choice awards.  Her short story collection My Body to You won the Iowa Short Fiction Prize (James Salter, judge) and Celebrities in Disgracewas a finalist for the Paterson Fiction Prize.  'Celebrities in Disgrace' was produced as a short film that screened at various festivals.  Searle's one act play, 'Stolen Girl Song' was produced at the Act One One Act Play festival 'off Off Broadway' in 2019.  Searle wrote the libretto for Tonya and Nancy:The Opera," produced in 2006, 2010, 2014 and in Minneapolis in 2018. 

Her and Michael Teoli's full length musical, "Tonya and Nancy: The Rock Opera" was produced in NYC as a sold-out Full Production show at the New York Musical Festival (NYMF). Producer Paul Boghosian/Harborside Films has produced the show multiple times.  The 2020 production won four Broadway World Regional Theater awards.  Searle's theater works and her upcoming Feature Film have drawn national media attention.

Early life
Searle was born in Penn Wynne, Pennsylvania. Her father Bill was a Democratic Party activist and retired personnel director; Barbara, her mother, was a children's librarian. She has a younger sister, Kate, who works at MIT and Bill, her older brother, is a videographer.  Her family moved during her childhood from PA to SC to KY to AZ.

Education
Searle received a B.A. from Oberlin College and her Master's degree from Brown University. She was a special education teacher and taught students with autism in schools located in New Haven, Connecticut and Providence, Rhode Island.

Career
In 1982, Searle's short story, "Missing LaDonna", appeared in Redbook.  This was followed by stories placed in the South Carolina Review, the Indiana Review, The Greensboro Review, the Kenyon Review, Ploughshares and other journals.  In 1993 her first book, My Body To You, was published.  In 1992, it had been named winner of the Iowa Short Fiction Award by the Iowa Writers Workshop. James Salter, a novelist and screenwriter, who wrote The Hunters, Downhill Racer, The Appointment and others, acted as judge.

A Four Sided Bed, Searle's first novel, was published by Graywolf Press in 1998 and received positive reviews from Kirkus Reviews and Booklist.  Her novel A Four-Sided Bed was nominated for an ALA book award and was sited as an Editor's Choice by Booklist, Amazon and more.  The book is now being developed as a Feature Film.

"We Got Him" was a Finalist for the Midwest Book Award and was published by New Rivers Press in 2016 and was released in AudioBook in 2018 by BlunderWoman Productions.  "Girl Held in Home" was also published by New Rivers Press, selected for the American Fiction Series.

A novella and collection of short stories entitled Celebrities in Disgrace was published in 2001.  It was a finalist for the Paterson Fiction Prize.  When discussing one of the themes of this collection during an interview with Post Road Magazine, Searle said, "I had a phrase in my mind, 'the witch of ambition,' and I do think there is this sort of dark force inside of people and any of those dark forces are hard to write about but they're the ones you want to write about...." Ambition and the search for attention seem to be the "...driving forces of our time."

"Celebrities in Disgrace," the title novella, was called a 'miniature masterpiece' by New York Times Book Review.  Celebrities in Disgrace was produced as a short film in 2010 by Bravo Sierra Pictures, with a script co-written by Elizabeth Searle.  The film premiered as an official selection at Woods Hole International Film Festival on Cape Cod and has screened at other festivals throughout the country.  Searle's novel A Four-Sided Bed was also the basis of an award-winning short film that screened widely at festivals, Four-Sided (2019)

Tonya and Nancy: The Rock Opera was most recently produced in 2020 by TheatreZone in a production starring Broadway's Andrea McArdle (ANNIE) and reviewed as a 'joyous theater package.'  The show was produced as a concert event at Lucille Lortel Theater in NYC in 2019 and was recorded in concert at 54Below in Feb 2018.  The 54Below concert CD was reviewed as 'stunningly awesome.'  The concert is available on film (2021).  The rock opera premiered in 2008 in Portland, OR, produced by Triangle Productions. It featured libretto by Searle and music by Michael Teoli. The show was based on Searle and Abigail Al Doory Cross's Tonya & Nancy: the Opera, libretto and concept by Elizabeth Searle; adapted for the Portland production by Don Horn and Searle.  The rock opera reviewed as "brilliant and touching" in Portland Mercury and received widespread media attention described in The Oregonian. Tonya & Nancy: the Rock Opera premiered in a new version with a new Book by Searle in January 2011, produced by Harborside Films and performed at the American Repertory Theater's Oberon Theater.  Boston reviews included these comments: "Black Swan on Ice" (The Boston Herald); "Absurdly funny; surprisingly poignant moments amidst the comedy and a rousing soundtrack" (The Boston Phoenix); ; "An explosive cabaret of over-the-top rock tunes sung with operatic glass-shattering intensity…practically Shakespeare on ice"; (The Noise); "Brilliant; amazing music; one of the most exciting spectacles I have ever seen' (Steve Almond; WGBH Boston).

The show premiered in Hollywood at the King King Club on February 4, 2014, as a benefit for the LA theater Celebration.  The show was performing as an official Full Production show at New York Musical Theater Festival (NYMF) in July 2015.  It was fully produced by Underscore Theater in Chicago for a 6 week run in Fall, 2016.  It was named one of the Top Five Musicals of the Year by New City Stages and was a Jeff Award 'recommended' show, nominated for two 2016/2017 Jeff Awards and winning Best Supporting Actress (Veronica Garza) for the Chicago production, directed by Jon Martinez.  A production in suburban Dallas Texas was produced in summer of 2018 at OhLook Performing Arts Center, where it ran along with Hedwig and Rocky Horror Picture Show.  The award-winning 2020 production at TheatreZone featured Broadway icon Andrea McArdle.

Searle also writes nonfiction.  Her essays have appeared in over a dozen anthologies.  She has co-edited an anthology on Soap Operas from McFarland Books (2017) and co-edited  an anthology with McFarland in 2018 on Teen Idols called IDOL TALK. Her essay "Knitted Goods: Notes from a Nervous Non-Knitter" appeared in the anthology Knitting Yarns: Writers on Knitting, published by W. W. Norton & Company in 2013.

Searle has recently focused on screenwriting.  Searle co-wrote with Tiffany Louquet and David Shields the feature film 'I'll Show You Mine' which is directed by Megan Giffiths and stars Poorna Jagannathan (Never Have I Ever) and Casey Thomas Brown (The Kominsky Method) and is a Duplass Brothers Production in post-production in 2021.  Searle's novel A Four-Sided Bed is being developed as a feature film by Creatrix Films and by producer David Ball.  Her script for A Four-Sided Bed has won recognition at over 20 festivals and award competitions in 2019-2020 including Best Feature Screenplay at the Massachusetts Independent Film Festival.  It was produced as a staged reading at Zephyr Theater in LA in 2016, starring Evan Ross (The Hunger Games) and Gia Mantegna (Under the Dome).  It was also performed as a Staged Reading in 2019 at ReelHeArt International Film Festival in Toronto.  Searle is completing a book of short stories and  has film and theater scripts in the works.

Searle has taught creative writing at Brown University, Emerson College, the University of Southern Maine's Program in Creative Writing, the University of Massachusetts Boston and other institutions.  She has taught at Stonecoast MFA since the program began in 2002.  Searle was a longtime member, Board officer and committee chairperson of the New England chapter of International PEN.  In 2020, she was one of six writers who formed the group Writers Against Racial Injustice which raised over $60,000 for the Equal Justice Initiative.  The group was featured in the Boston Globe and Publishers Weekly.  She is a member of Women in Film and Video.  In 1984, Searle married software engineer John Hodgkinson; they have a son, Will and reside in Arlington, Massachusetts.

Bibliography

Novels
 "We Got Him" (2016) 
 A Four-Sided Bed (1998) 
 "Girl Held in Home" (2011)

Story collections
  My Body To You (1993) 
  Celebrities in Disgrace (2001)

As contributor or editor
 Idol Talk: Women Writers on the Teenage Infatuations that Changed Their Lives; co-editor with Tamra Wilson of anthology and contributor of essay; published by McFarland Books, 2018
 Soap Opera Confidential: Women Writers on Why We Tune in Tomorrow as the World Turns Restlessly by the Guiding Light of our Lives; co-editor with Suzanne Strempek Shea; published by McFarland Books, 2017
 "Act Tresses: Hair as Performance Art"; Me, My Hair and I; anthology edited by Elizabeth Benedict; published by Algonquin Books, 2016
  "Knitted Goods: Notes from a Nervous Non-Knitter"; Knitting Yarns: Writers on Knitting. W. W. Norton & Company (2013)
  "Men Undressed: Women Writers and the Male Sexual Experience"; Dzanc Books, 2011
  "No Near Exit: Best of Post Road Magazine"; Dzanc Books, 2011
  Don't You Forget About Me: Contemporary Writers on the Films of John Hughes (2007)
  The Darfur Anthology (2007)
  Now Write!:Fiction Writing Exercises from Today's Best Writers and Teachers (2006)
  Out of the Blue Writers Unite (2004)
  The Iowa Award: The Best Stories, 1991-2000 (2001)
   American Fiction, Volume Seven: The Best Unpublished Short Stories by Emerging Writers (1995)
    Breaking Up Is Hard to Do: Stories by Women (1994)
    The Time of Our Lives: Women Write on Sex After 40 (1993)

External links
Websites
elizabethsearle.net, 
tonyaandnancytherockopera, 
afoursidedbedfilm.com 
Work
 VARIETY article on "I'll Show You Mine,' a feature film forthcoming in 2021: https://variety.com/2021/film/news/poorna-jagannathan-casey-thomas-brown-ill-show-you-mine-1234981327/
 "Why We're Here", Ploughshares (1996–1997)
 "White Eggplant", Ploughshares (1991)
Interviews
 Boston Globe (2008)
 Post Road (2003)
Reviews
 Review of Celebrities in Disgrace, New York Times Book Review (2001) 
 Review of "Tonya & Nancy: the Rock Opera"; Naples Daily News, (2020) https://www.naplesnews.com/story/life/neapolitan/2020/02/07/tonya-and-nancy-play-theatrezone-revisits-1990-s-figure-skating-scandal-naples-theater/4677973002/
 Review of A Four-Sided Bed, Standards Magazine, University of Colorado (1998)
 Review A Four-Sided Bed, Ploughshares (1998)
 Review of My Body To You, Ploughshares (1993)
Miscellaneous
 Audio File, Elizabeth Searle reading from Celebrities in Disgrace 
 Elizabeth Searle web site

Notes

20th-century American novelists
21st-century American novelists
American women novelists
American women short story writers
Novelists from Pennsylvania
Novelists from Maine
Novelists from Massachusetts
1962 births
Living people
20th-century American women writers
21st-century American women writers
American women dramatists and playwrights
21st-century American dramatists and playwrights
People from Lower Merion Township, Pennsylvania
Oberlin College alumni
Brown University alumni
Brown University faculty
Emerson College faculty
University of Southern Maine faculty
University of Massachusetts Boston faculty
People from Arlington, Massachusetts
20th-century American dramatists and playwrights
20th-century American short story writers
21st-century American short story writers
American women academics